Cinch may refer to:

A cinch, (alternate spelling sinch) a type of saddle girth (tack)
A belay device for sport climbing
RCA connector, which is sometimes known as a CINCH/AV connector
Cinch (card game), an American card game in the All Fours family, related to Pitch/Setup and Pedro
Cinch (company)

See also
Waist cincher
Sinch (disambiguation)